Ronald, Ron or Ronnie Williams may refer to:

Arts and entertainment
Ronald "Slim" Williams (born 1964), American record company executive; cofounder of Cash Money Records
Ronnie Williams (1939–1997), Welsh actor and comedian

Politics
Ronald Jay Williams (1928–2000), Trinidadian businessman and politician
Ronald Williams (Labour politician) (1907–1958), British Labour politician, Member of Parliament for Wigan
Ronald Williams (Liberal politician) (1890–1971), English Liberal politician, Member of Parliament for Sevenoaks

Sports
Ron Williams (basketball) (1944–2004), American basketball player
Ron Williams (footballer) (1917–1987), Australian rules footballer
Ron Williams (rugby union) (born 1963), New Zealand rugby union player
Ronald Williams (Canadian football) (born 1972), Canadian Football League running back
Ronnie Williams (American football) (born 1966), American footballer
Ronnie Williams (basketball) (1962–2021), American basketball player
Ronnie Williams (footballer) (1907–1987), Swansea Town, Newcastle United and Wales international footballer
Ronnie Williams (baseball) (born 1996), American baseball pitcher

Others
Ron Williams (born 1949), American business executive; Chief Executive of Aetna corporation
Ron Williams (bishop), Assistant Bishop of Brisbane, 1993–2007
Ronald Williams (bishop) (1906–1979), Bishop of Leicester, 1953–1979
Ronald A. Williams II (1969–1995), slain police officer from New Orleans
Ronald J. Williams, professor of computer science at Northeastern University